Retail's BIG Show, or the NRF Annual Convention & EXPO, is the flagship industry event of the National Retail Federation (NRF).

Retail's BIG Show is an annual event held over three days in New York City.

It is the world's leading annual retail event, bringing together 37,000 retail professionals and vendors from more than 90 countries for educational and networking opportunities. In 2020, Retail's Big Show had more than 300 speakers, 800 exhibitors, 40,000 attendees and 200 sessions.

Retail's BIG Show has frequently been ranked as one of the Top 200 events in North America, as well as one of the 50 fastest-growing trade events.

Events 
Retail, technology and business leaders are among the headline speakers for the event, which has seen over 37,000 retailers from nearly 100 countries gather in New York to address the latest trends, innovations and strategies for transformation.

Retail's Big Show went virtual in 2021, its 110th year, with 90 sessions and 300 exhibitors.

History
The National Retail Federation (NRF) is the world's largest retail trade association, with members including department store, specialty, discount, catalogue, Internet, and independent retailers, chain restaurants, and grocery stores. It is also an umbrella group that represents more than 100 associations of state, national and international retailers.

NRF began in 1911 as the National Retail Dry Goods Association (NRDGA). This was also the year of its first annual meeting.  In 1958, NRDGA was renamed National Retail Merchants Association. In 1990, the association and the American Retail Federation merged to form the National Retail Federation. During all the years, an annual convention was held for members.

Today, Retail's BIG Show continues to be an annual event held over four days beginning in the second week of January, at the Jacob K. Javits Convention Center in New York City.

The EXPO Floor is open each day of the convention and hosts more than 700 exhibiting companies. The EXPO features special sessions produced by the NRF covering a wide range of topics such as sustainability, visual merchandising and the global economy. Exhibitors also offer their own sessions with product demos and case studies titled Exhibitor Big Ideas.

The Innovation Lab, added to the show for the first time in 2018, showcases technologies of the future and how they are transforming the way retailers market, connect and serve their customers in immersive and interactive demonstrations. Robotics, personalization, augmented reality, faster checkout systems, spatial recognition and other technologies are on display that are either already in commercial use or at the start-up stage.

The NRF Foundation Gala is held each year during the NRF convention. This event raises money for foundation programming, dedicated to shaping retail's future, and honors the 25 individuals named to the foundation's annual “List of People Shaping Retail’s Future.” Many of those on the list also speak at Big Show.

In 2021, the event featured sessions focused on helping retailers understand the business changes that happened as a result of the COVID-19 pandemic, as well as a focus on how to move forward and best prepare for 2021 and 2022. This included sessions discussing how to stay on top of online inventory and shopping behavior, how to engage with new-to-online shoppers, and many success stories and case studies. The event also focused on the employee side of retail, such as how to best support employees during a year when mental health and stress issues increased. Former Secretary of State Condoleezza Rice gave the keynote speech on January 12 for the virtual event. Other major speakers included Walmart Chief Customer Officer Janey Whiteside and JPMorgan Chase CEO Jamie Dimon, and Deloitte's Chief Global Economist Ira Kalish.

References

 Shoptimism: Why the American Consumer Will Keep on Buying No Matter What, by Lee Eisenberg. Free Press, 2009. Pages 33–40.

Trade shows in the United States